Fred Dubois (1851–1930) was a U.S. Senator from Idaho from 1891 to 1897 and from 1901 to 1907. Senator Dubios may also refer to:

William H. Dubois (1835–1907), Vermont State Senate
William DuBose (politician) (1786/87–1855), South Carolina State Senate